HIOC is a small-molecule agent which acts as a selective TrkB receptor agonist (active at at least 100 nM; prominent activation at 500 nM). It was derived from N-acetylserotonin (NAS). Relative to NAS, HIOC possesses greater potency and a longer half-life (~30 min or less for NAS in rats, while HIOC is still detectable up to 24 hours after administration to mice; ~4 hour half-life for HIOC in mouse brain tissues). It is described as producing long-lasting activation of the TrkB receptor and downstream signaling kinases associated with the receptor. HIOC is systemically-active and is able to penetrate the blood-brain-barrier. In animal studies, HIOC was found to robustly protect against glutamate-induced excitotoxicity, an action which was TrkB-dependent.

A chemical synthesis of HIOC was published in 2015.

See also
 Tropomyosin receptor kinase B § Agonists

References

Carboxamides
Tryptamines
Neuroprotective agents
Lactams
TrkB agonists